Elguja Amashukeli  (Georgian: ელგუჯა დავითის ძე ამაშუკელი; 22 April 1928 – 10 March  2002) was a Georgian sculptor and painter. From 1981 to 1996 he was the chairman of the Georgian Association of Visual Artists.

Life 
Elguja Amashukeli graduated from the Tbilisi State Academy of Arts in 1955.

Since 1996 he has been a corresponding member of the Department of Linguistics and Literature of the Georgian Academy of Sciences. In 1985 he became a member of the Soviet Academy of Arts. He designed subway stations, created memorials and monuments in Georgia.

Elguja Amashukeli died on March 10, 2002, and is buried in the Didube Pantheon Cemetery in Tbilisi.

He wrote two books: The Seventh Sense (1981) and Art Letters (1984).

Works (selection) 
 Mother of Georgia, Tbilisi (1958)
 Monument to King Vakhtang I Gorgasali, Tbilisi (1967)
 Monument to Niko Pirosmani, Tbilisi (1975)
 Monument to the heroic sailors, Poti (1979)
 Monument to the Mother Tongue "Knowledge Bell", Tbilisi (1983)
 Monument to King David IV the Builder, Kutaisi (1994)

Awards 
 USSR State Prize
 Shota Rustaveli State Prize (1965)
 Prize of the World Competition in Sofia (1970)

References 

Sculptors from Georgia (country)
Rustaveli Prize winners
Painters from Georgia (country)
People's Artists of the USSR (visual arts)
Soviet painters
Modern painters
2002 deaths
1928 births
Recipients of the USSR State Prize
Corresponding Members of the Georgian National Academy of Sciences